Neanura muscorum is a species of Collembola, which are commonly called springtails, in the family Neanuridae and subfamily Neanurinae. It is extremely common and most often found under bark (in Europe).

Characteristics 
Neanura muscorum is 3.5 mm in length and is covered in warty bumps and long setae. It is blueish grey and has three ocelli. It lacks a furca. It eats small plants and fungi growing on the bark. It, like many other Collembola, serves as prey for a lot of predatory arthropods.

References 

 Stephen P. Hopkin: A key to the Collembola (springtails) of Britain and Ireland, Shrewsbury 2007, 

Neanuridae
Arthropods of Europe